The Radulja  is a river of Slovenia. It is a left tributary of the Krka River.

References

Rivers of Lower Carniola
Natura 2000 in Slovenia